Eid Gah Mosque or Id Gah Mosque, is the second largest mosque in Kabul, the capital of Afghanistan. It is considered the cardinal religious mosque in the country, where a million people offer Eid prayers twice a year. It is located near the Mahmud Khan bridge and National Stadium in the eastern part of the city, in the Shar-e-barq of Kabul, which is one of the wealthier areas of the city.  The "Id Gah" or "Eid Gah" refers to an open space where people congregate during national and religious celebrations. The open grounds of Id Gah are also used as a parking lot for trucks that transport goods to and from Peshawar.

In most references Babur, a Muslim warrior at the time had just invaded India and ordered a Mosque be built to glorify Islam, he had his warriors bring back precious stone from the Punjab, Sindh and surrounding areas and had Persian architects build a structure for his Kabul subjects. It has been the scene of religious festivals, religious ceremonies, state functions such as coronations and priestly religious ceremonies attended by Kings and Amirs. It was from this mosque that the then Amir Habibullah made his historic announcement of his country's independence, in 1919.

The Id Gah Mosque was stated to be a target of attack when two suspects were arrested on February 10, 2006 with their vehicle found loaded with 8 kg of explosives.

History

Id Gah Mosque was commissioned by Babur the ruler of the Mughal empire before being renovated on a large scale by King Abdur Rahman Khan in 1893 or before. Another story relates to Jahangir being the original builder of this mosque, using local quarries and materials as Kabul was a key mughal city works of art were often commissioned here. 

Afghan history records indicate that in 1901, the then Emir of Afghanistan, the head of the state, publicly performed the priestly functions by celebrating the Id at Id Gah Mosque. The chief priest of Kabul immediately proclaimed Habibullah to be the successor of Mohamed, whereupon the Emir of Afghanistan delivered an address inspired by an "intolerant ecclesiasticism". Among other things the Amir passed a dictum that a fine of up to ten Kabuli Rupees would be levied on all who did not offer prayers in the mosques. A register of the daily attendance of all individuals was to be kept in various places and a “box of justice” was to be kept into which secret reports could be dropped reporting on people who had not obeyed this dictum of compulsory attendance for religious prayers at the mosques.

In 1914–15, the bitter feud between Britain and Afghanistan assumed the proportions of a holy war or jihad, even though the new ruler Emir Habibullah had initially opposed this approach of the mullahs. After his ascension to the throne in 1919, he aligned with the mullahs to attack British bases. Before he launched a war on May 15, 1919, the Emir made a speech at the Id Gah Mosque in Kabul urging his countrymen to wage jihad against the British. 

After the Third Anglo-Afghan War, on August 19, 1919, Emir Amanullah announced Afghanistan's independence from this mosque.

On September 21, 2010 a demonstration took place at the mosque.

On October 3, 2021 a bomb attack at the mosque killed several people.

Architecture

Id Gah Mosque is located in an affluent part of Kabul and reflects the rich Muslim architecture and heritage. It attracts pilgrims from far-afield to visit this holy place. The mosque is painted in beige and white and has four minarets at the front, two flanking the higher central arch and then one either side of the arched sections on either side of the central arch. There are in turn four minarets assembled in the same fashion on the other side and a single smaller minaret of a different color in the centre of the roof. The mosque is a very long building and narrow in width. Excluding the prominent central beige painted area of 3 archways, the mosque has 18 dark archways either side along its length. The courtyard area, known as Eid Gah Square, is vast and is capable of holding massive populations of Muslims who attend the mosque during the prayer season.

References

16th-century mosques
Mosques completed in 1893
Mosques in Kabul
Eidgahs
Sunni mosques in Afghanistan